Magdalena Witek (born 20 March 1994) is a Polish badminton player.

Achievements

BWF International Challenge/Series 
Women's doubles

  BWF International Challenge tournament
  BWF International Series tournament
  BWF Future Series tournament

References

External links 
 

1994 births
Living people
Sportspeople from Słupsk
Polish female badminton players